Gillett is an unincorporated community in Bradford County, Pennsylvania, United States. Gillett has a post office with ZIP code 16925.

References

Unincorporated communities in Bradford County, Pennsylvania
Unincorporated communities in Pennsylvania